Roger Kamien (born 1934) is a retired professor emeritus of musicology in the Hebrew University of Jerusalem, Israel. He was born in Paris, and was raised in America. He is the author of the book Music: An Appreciation, which is intended to show students the basics and the importance of music. It is considered essentially a textbook because its use mostly in colleges (and sometimes in high schools). It is published by McGraw-Hill and provides learners with information on how to understand classical and modern music.

Kamien taught at Queens College, New York. He developed the concept of the listening outline, which he incorporated into the first edition of Music: An Appreciation and which he has refined and enhanced in every subsequent edition. This is a text intended for students of all levels and backgrounds. The latest edition is the twelfth.   It contains a multimedia CD-ROM and histories of jazz, rock, and classical music and details of the composition of an orchestra.

Kamien has studied the piano with Claudio Arrau, among others; and Schenkerian analysis with Felix Salzer and Ernst Oster. He obtained a doctorate degree from Princeton University in 1964.

He is the editor of the widely used series Norton Scores, and the author of numerous academic articles on musicology.

References

Further reading
Reviews of his books:
Music: An Appreciation.
Music Educators Journal Nov 2001 v88 p69
Teaching Music August 1998 v6 p44
Norton Scores. (Book Review)
Library Journal Sept 1, 1972 p2712
Opera News Oct 12, 1968 p30
Library Journal Oct 1, 1968 p3564
The New York Times Book Review Sept 8, 1968 p22

External links
Personal page at the Hebrew University site
Official page of the book Music: An Appreciation

Israeli musicologists
Academic staff of the Hebrew University of Jerusalem
Living people
1934 births